Norbert Kerckhove (21 October 1932 – 4 July 2006) was a Belgian professional racing cyclist. He won the E3 Harelbeke in 1959.

References

External links

1932 births
2006 deaths
Belgian male cyclists
People from Meulebeke
Cyclists from West Flanders
20th-century Belgian people